Tangsuyuk is a Korean Chinese meat dish with sweet and sour sauce. It can be made with either pork or beef.

History and etymology 
Tangsuyuk is a dish that was first made by Chinese merchants in the port city of Incheon, where the majority of the ethnic Chinese population in comtemporary South Korea live. It is derived from the  Shandong-style dish tángcùròu, as Chinese immigrants in Korea, including those that had first migrated to Northeastern China, mostly had Shandong ancestry.

Although the Chinese characters meaning "sugar", "vinegar", and "meat" are pronounced dang, cho, and yuk in Korean, the dish is called tangsuyuk, not dangchoyuk, because the word tangsu derived from the transliteration of Chinese pronunciation tángcù , with the affricate c  in the second syllable  weakened into fricative s . 

The third syllable ròu was not transliterated, as Sino-Korean word yuk meaning "meat" was also commonly used in Korean dish names. As the word tangsuyuk is the combination of transliterated loanword tangsu and Sino-Korean yuk, it was not a Sino-Korean vocabulary that could be written in hanja. However, Koreans back-formed the second syllable with hanja su, meaning "water", perhaps because the sauce was considered soupy.

Preparation 
Bite-size pieces of pork or beef loin are coated with batter, usually made by soaking a mixture of potato or sweet potato starch and corn starch in water for several hours and draining the excess water. Glutinous rice flour may also be used. Egg white or cooking oil is added to the batter to change its consistency. Similarly to other Korean deep fried dishes, battered tangsuyuk meat is double-fried.

Tangsuyuk is served with sweet and sour sauce, which is typically made by boiling vinegar, sugar and water, with variety of fruits and vegetables like carrot, cucumber, onion, water chestnut,  wood ear mushroom and pineapple. Starch slurry is used to thicken the sauce.

Gallery

See also 
 Guōbāoròu

References 

Deep fried foods
Korean Chinese cuisine
Korean beef dishes
Korean pork dishes